John Michael Kirkpatrick  (born 8 August 1947) is an English musician, best known as a player of free reed instruments.

In London 
John Kirkpatrick was born in Chiswick, London, England. As a child he sang in the choir and played piano. In 1959, he joined the Hammersmith Morris Men, in the second week of their existence, beginning a career-long love of folk music. In 1970, he became a regular at a folk club in the Roebuck pub in Tottenham Court Road and led the resident group, Dingle's Chillybom Band. The club hosted a film show of Morris dancing and Ashley Hutchings turned up. It was the beginning of a long musical relationship. In 1972 he teamed up with Ashley and others on the album Morris On. In 1972, Kirkpatrick recorded his first solo album Jump at the Sun which included Richard Thompson on acoustic guitar.

In Shropshire 
In 1973, Kirkpatrick moved to Shropshire and married Sue Harris. After seeing a dance team called Gloucestershire Old Spot Morris Dancers, he formed Shropshire Bedlams to perform local dances in the Border Morris style. In the early weeks some girls turned up and rather than have a mixed morris team, Harris took the girls aside to form Martha Rhoden's Tuppenny Dish; both teams are still flourishing and celebrated their fortieth anniversary in 2015. By this time Kirkpatrick was an expert player of melodeon, Anglo concertina, and button accordion. Ashley Hutchings' project Battle of the Field floundered when the Albion Country Band broke up. They had recorded not quite enough material for an album. Kirkpatrick had appeared on several of the tracks with Martin Carthy and offered to record two extra tracks with his wife in 1973. It was not released until 1976 but is highly regarded.  Harris sang and played oboe and hammered dulcimer, an unusual combination. In 1974, Kirkpatrick and Hutchings produced a themed album The Compleat Dancing Master, a history of English country dancing. In 1976, he teamed up with Carthy for Plain Capers, a collection of morris dance tunes.

Steeleye Span 
In 1977, Steeleye Span recruited both Kirkpatrick and Carthy, partly to replace fiddler Peter Knight. Kirkpatrick appearing on the albums Storm Force Ten and Live at Last; in concert with them, he would perform solo morris dances. In the same period, Kirkpatrick released two albums as a duo with Sue Harris. He became part of Richard Thompson's backing band in 1975. This brought him such publicity that he was in heavy demand as a session musician. He recorded with Pere Ubu, Viv Stanshall, Jack the Lad, Gerry Rafferty, Maddy Prior and others. In 1980 he released his only single, "Jogging Along with My Reindeer". Two more albums with Sue Harris appeared in 1981, but the constant touring, as a duo and as part of other groups, was putting a strain on the marriage. They had four sons together, but parted in the mid 1980s. In 1988, he and Sue published Opus Pocus, a collection of many of their own compositions from the previous 20 years, and a selection of some of the (then) more obscure traditional English tunes which had influenced them.

Brass Monkey 
In 1979, Kirkpatrick had appeared in the National Theatre Company's stage show Lark Rise to Candleford together with Carthy and trumpeter Howard Evans. Prior to this the use of brass instruments in English folk music was a rare event, but all three had found it thrilling and a couple of years later formed Brass Monkey with Martin Brinsford from the Old Swan Band. The group is an occasional gathering rather than a fixed company. Roy Bailey, like Leon Rosselson has frequently recorded songs of social commentary, frequently on an anti-war theme. He has made several records with Roy Bailey, as well as in a group called Band of Hope. He recorded with Frankie Armstrong in 1996 and 1997. They share a love of early English ballads.

John Kirkpatrick Band
In 1997, he decided to front his own "rock-folk" band, and put together a line-up consisting of Graeme Taylor (guitar, electric guitar, banjo, mandolin – ex Gryphon, The Albion Band and Home Service), Mike Gregory (drums, percussion – ex Albion Band, Home Service), Dave Berry (electric bass, double bass, tuba) and Paul Burgess (fiddle, recorders – from the Old Swan Band).  They made two albums: a live album "Force of Habit" containing many of Kirkpatrick's arrangements of Morris tunes, plus other material from his back catalogue, plus a studio album "Welcome To Hell" featuring new material.

As soloist 
Since 1993, Kirkpatrick has recorded seven solo albums. He often unearths obscure English tunes and songs from folk ceremonies. Recently he has started to explore Balkan and Hungarian dance tunes. He has produced one of the only teaching videos for English (D/G) melodeon, also on DVD. A further teaching resource is his 2003 book of traditional tunes, English Choice, and two accompanying CDs. He has recently started to perform with accordion wizard Chris Parkinson as the Sultans of Squeeze, and the pair have released one album. He is remarried. One of his sons, Benji Kirkpatrick, is a member  of Faustus, a former member of Bellowhead and Magpie Lane, and has recorded as a solo guitarist. He has succeeded his father as a member of Steeleye Span. All four of his sons do morris dancing. As a composer, choreographer and musical director, Kirkpatrick has contributed to over 60 plays in the theatre and on radio.

Kirkpatrick was appointed Member of the Order of the British Empire (MBE) in the 2021 New Year Honours for services to folk music.

Discography 
Solo albums
Jump at the Sun 				(1972)
Going Spare 				(1978)
Three in a Row				(1983)
Blue Balloon				(1987)
Sheepskins					(1988)
Earthling					(1994)
One Man and His Box			(1999)
Mazurka Berzerker				(2001)
The Duck Race				(2004)
A Short History of John Kirkpatrick (anthology) (1994)
Make No Bones (2 CDs) (2007)
Dance of the Demon Daffodils               (2009)
God Speed the Plough                       (2011)
Every Mortal Place                         (2013)
Tunes from the Trenches                    (2015)
Coat Tails Flying                          (2017)

John Kirkpatrick and Sue Harris
The Rose of Britain's Isle				(1974)
Among The Many Attractions at the Show will be a Really High Class Band		(1976)
Shreds and Patches				(1977)
Facing the Music				(1980)
Ballad of the Black Country		(1981)
Stolen Ground				(1989)

Ashley Hutchings with John Kirkpatrick
Morris On (1972)
The Compleat Dancing Master		(1974)

John Kirkpatrick and Martin Carthy
Plain Capers				(1976)

With the Albion Band
Battle of the Field				(1976)
Lark Rise To Candleford			(1980)
The BBC Sessions   			(1998) (tracks 1 – 4, recorded 1973)

With John Raven and Sue Harris
The English Canals				(1975) [reissued in 1999 as The Bold Navigators – The Story of England's Canals in Song]

With Steeleye Span
Storm Force Ten				(1977)
Live at Last!					(1978)

With Brass Monkey
Brass Monkey 				(1983)
See How it Runs 				(1986)
Sound and Rumour				(1999)
Going And Staying				(2001)
Flame of Fire				(2004)
The Complete Brass Monkey (anthology)

John Kirkpatrick Band
Force of Habit 				(1997)
Welcome To Hell 				(1997)

With Umps and Dumps
The Moon's in a Fit				(1980)

John Kirkpatrick, Maddy Prior and Sydney Carter
Lovely in the Dances: Songs of Sydney Carter				(1981)

Kepa Junkera, Riccardo Tesi, John Kirkpatrick
Trans-Europe Diatonique                           (1993)

John Kirkpatrick, Rosie Cross, Georgina Le Faux, Michael Gregory, Jane Threlfall, Carl Hogsden
Wassail!                                   (1997)

Maddy Prior, John Kirkpatrick, Frankie Armstrong, Nic Jones, Gordeanna McCulloch
Ballads					(1997)

John Kirkpatrick and Chris Parkinson
Sultans of Squeeze                         (2005)

As session musician
Henry The Human Fly (Richard Thompson) (1972)
I Want To See The Bright Lights Tonight (Richard and Linda Thompson) (1974)
Hokey Pokey (Richard and Linda Thompson) (1975)
Pour Down Like Silver (Richard and Linda Thompson) (1975)
First Light (Richard and Linda Thompson) (1977)
Sunnyvista  (Richard and Linda Thompson) (1978)
My Very Favourite Nursery Rhymes  (Tim Hart and Friends) (1981)
Hand of Kindness (Richard Thompson) (1983)
Daring Adventures  (Richard Thompson) (1986)
The Crab Wars: A Ballad of the Olden Times, As Remembered by Sid and Henry Kipper (The Kipper Family)			(1986)
Amnesia (Richard Thompson) (1988)
Why Does It Have To Be Me? (Roy Bailey) (1989)
Sweet Talker (Richard Thompson) (1991)
Rumor and Sigh (Richard Thompson) (1991)
The Happiness Counter (Leon Rosselson)	(1992)
Mirror Blue (Richard Thompson) (1994)
More Guitar  (Richard Thompson) (2003)
Boomerang (Benji Kirkpatrick) (2007)

Original film soundtrack
Rêve de Siam (with Dan Ar Braz)	(1992)

Compilation albums
The Rough Guide to English Roots Music (1998, World Music Network)
Three Score and Ten (2009, Topic)

The tracks Kirkpatrick performs on in the Three Score and Ten boxed set are "The Rose Of Britain's Isle" / "Glorishears" from the Rose Of Britain's Isle; "The Maid and the Palmer" as part of Brass Monkey; and "George's Son" featuring Brass Monkey from See How it Runs.

References

External links
Homepage

1947 births
Living people
English folk musicians
Ashley Hutchings
English folk singers
People from Chiswick
Steeleye Span members
British folk rock musicians
English melodeon players
Concertina players
21st-century accordionists
Brass Monkey (band) members
The Albion Band members
Members of the Order of the British Empire